Lee Hye-jin ( or  , born ) is a South Korean track cyclist.

At the 2012 Summer Olympics, she competed in the women's sprint, women's keirin, and women's team sprint.

She was eighth at the 2016 Summer Olympics in keirin.

Major results
2014
Asian Track Championships
2nd  500m Time Trial
2nd  Team Sprint (with Kim Won-gyeong)
2nd  Team Sprint, Asian Games (with Kim Won-gyeong)
2nd Sprint, Japan Track Cup 1
3rd Keirin, Japan Track Cup 2
Incheon International Track Competition
3rd Keirin
3rd Sprint
2015
Asian Track Championships
1st  Team Sprint (with Choi Seulgi)
2nd  Keirin
2016
2nd  Team Sprint, Asian Track Championships (with Cho Sun-young)
2017
1st  Team Sprint, Asian Track Championships (with Kim Won-gyeong)

References

External links

1992 births
South Korean female cyclists
Living people
Olympic cyclists of South Korea
Cyclists at the 2012 Summer Olympics
Cyclists at the 2016 Summer Olympics
Cyclists at the 2020 Summer Olympics
South Korean track cyclists
Asian Games medalists in cycling
Cyclists at the 2014 Asian Games
Cyclists at the 2018 Asian Games
Medalists at the 2014 Asian Games
Medalists at the 2018 Asian Games
Asian Games silver medalists for South Korea
Asian Games bronze medalists for South Korea
Sportspeople from Gyeonggi Province
20th-century South Korean women
21st-century South Korean women